North Carolina Highway 93 (NC 93) is a primary state highway in the U.S. state of North Carolina. It runs from the Virginia state line to the community of Twin Oaks, entirely in Alleghany County.

Route description
It is overlapped with NC Bike Route 4 along the entire length of the route.

History

Originally established as North Carolina Highway 260 in 1935, it was renumbered in 1940 to match the older Virginia State Route 93. In 1977, NC 93 was rerouted in Piney Creek to its current routing; abandoning Pugh Road and extending NC 113 further north to its current northern terminus.

NC 93 existed two times before it current routing:
 In 1929, it was established as a new road from Pittsboro to Graham; then in 1933 it was extended further to US 70/NC 10. In 1940, it was renumbered as NC 87, with its 1933 extension forming part of NC 54.
 In 1940, NC 93 was established briefly as a connector between Tramway to Jonesboro (community later absorbed by Sanford). It was renumbered to NC 78 in late 1940 when NCDOT decided it was more important to match Virginia instead.

Major intersections

References

External links

NCRoads.com: N.C. 93

093
Transportation in Alleghany County, North Carolina